This is a complete list of Francisco Goya's 63 large cartoons for tapestries (Spanish: cartones para tapices) painted on commission for Charles III of Spain and later Charles IV of Spain between 1775 and 1791 to hang in the San Lorenzo de El Escorial and El Pardo palaces. The word "cartoon" is derived from the Italian cartone, which describes a large sheet of paper used in preparation for a later painting or tapestry. Goya's were executed on canvas which was then woven into wool tapestry to a large mural scale. While many of the large finished works are today in the Prado Museum, the original sketches were sold as works in their own right.

In 1774, Goya was asked by the German artist Anton Raphael Mengs, acting on behalf of the Spanish crown, to undertake the series. While designing tapestries was neither prestigious nor well paid, Goya used them, along with his early engravings, to bring himself to wider attention. They afforded his first contact with the Spanish monarchy that was to eventually appoint him court painter. The works are mostly popularist in a rococo style, and were completed early in his career, when he was largely unknown and actively seeking commissions. There is evidence that he later regretted having spent so much effort and time on the pieces, and that his later darker period, which begins roughly with Yard with Lunatics, was in part a reaction against them.

By 1776, aged 29, he had completed five tapestries, by the Real Fábrica de Tapices de Santa Bárbara, the royal tapestry manufactory. His brother-in-law Francisco Bayeu was made director of the tapestry works in 1777, which greatly advanced the ambitious artist's career prospects. However, Goya was beset by illness during the period, and his condition was used against him by the contemporary art scene, which looked jealously upon any artist seen to be rising in stature. Some of the larger cartoons, such as The Wedding, were more than 8 by 10 feet, and had proved a drain on his physical strength. Ever resourceful, Goya turned this misfortune around, claiming that his illness had allowed him the insight to produce works that were more personal and informal. However, he found the format limiting, because being inherently matte, tapestry was unable to capture complex colour shift or texture, and was unsuited to the impasto and glazing techniques he was by then applying to his painted works.

Dating the series has not been difficult as the Royal Tapestry Works maintained a detailed record of the dates, titles, sizes and states in which each of the cartoons arrived. Goya's letters to his friends (in particular his correspondence with the Aragonese industrialist Martín Zapater) contain additional details.

Groupings

The series can be divided into a number of groups based on intended location or theme. Art historians Valeriano Bozal and Nigel Glendinning arrange the series in four groups, whereas Janis Tomlinson places them in seven. The Goya catalogue of the Museo del Prado is closer to Tomlinson than to Bozal or Glendinning, but attempts to reconcile the two positions by grouping the cartoons into five sequences.

Goya had at first wanted to paint French or Dutch pastoral scenes, however Charles IV preferred "entertainments and clothing of the present time". This afforded Goya the opportunity to study closely his fellow citizens going about their daily lives, and allowed him to work outside of ecclesiastical commissions, which he often found dull and uninspiring. In general the cartoons are playful and depict the leisure activities of a variety of ages and social classes. Nine are hunting scenes that were for the dining room at the Escorial, which pleased the king's son—the future Charles IV—who was an avid hunter. A further ten were created for the dining room at El Pardo. The prince's wife, Maria Luisa, enjoyed the scenes of dancing and singing. The works are painted in the then-fashionable Rococo style, and heavily influenced by Antoine Watteau, whose work Goya came to know through his studies of  Titian.

First series (1775)

Second series (1776–1778)

Third series (1778–1779)

Fourth series (1779–1780)

Fifth series (1786–1787)

Sixth series (1787–1788)

Seventh series (1791–1792)

Sketches

See also 

 List of works by Francisco Goya

Notes

Bibliography 
 Bozal, Valeriano. Francisco Goya, vida y obra, Madrid, Tf, 2005, 2 vols. (Aficiones, 5-6). .
 Gassier, Pierre and Juliet Wilson–Bareau. Vida y obra de Francisco Goya, Barcelona, Juventud. .
 Glendinning, Nigel. Francisco de Goya, Madrid, Arlanza, Biblioteca «Descubrir el Arte», 2005. .
 Hagen, Rose-Marie & Hagen, Rainer. Francisco Goya, 1746-1828. Taschen, 2003. 
 Hughes, Robert. Goya. New York: Alfred A. Knopf, 2004. 
 Mena Márquez, Manuela de. Goya: guía de sala, Madrid, Tf, 2008. .
 Tomlinson, Janis A. Francisco de Goya: los cartones para tapices y los comienzos de su carrera en la Corte de Madrid, Madrid, Cátedra, 1993. .
 Francisco Goya. Kent: Grange Books, 2004. 

Paintings by Francisco Goya
Goya tapestry cartoons
Tapestry cartoons
Lists of cartoons